Jonathan Peter Pearce (born 18 April 1957) is an English former first-class cricketer.

Pearce was born at Newcastle upon Tyne in April 1957. He was educated at Ampleforth College, before going up to St Benet's Hall, Oxford. While studying at Oxford, he played first-class cricket for Oxford University in 1978 and 1979, making seven appearances and gaining a blue. Playing as a slow left-arm orthodox bowler, he took 11 wickets at an average of 45.27, with best figures of 4 for 94. 

After graduating from Oxford Pearce became a solicitor in corporate law, specialising in mergers, acquisitions and corporate finance. He sits on the governing council at Benenden School and is treasurer of the Free Foresters Cricket Club. Pearce is married with two sons.

References

External links

1957 births
Living people
Cricketers from Newcastle upon Tyne
People educated at Ampleforth College
Alumni of St Benet's Hall, Oxford
English cricketers
Oxford University cricketers
English solicitors